Robert Henry Mudd (February 23, 1875 – January 30, 1904) was a college football player and coach. He was a relative of Harvey Seeley Mudd.

Early years
Mudd was born on February 23, 1875, in St. Louis, Missouri, to Dr. Henry Hodgen Mudd.

University of Virginia

Playing
Mudd was a prominent end for the Virginia Cavaliers football team of the University of Virginia. He was selected All-Southern in 1895.

Coaching
He was an assistant at his alma mater in 1898.

References

1875 births
1904 deaths
19th-century players of American football
American football ends
Virginia Cavaliers football coaches
Virginia Cavaliers football players
All-Southern college football players
Players of American football from St. Louis